Face in the Sky is a 1933 American Pre-Code comedy film.

Plot
The film concerns two sign painters (Spencer Tracy and Stuart Erwin) who find themselves blackmailed by a beautiful woman (Marian Nixon) determined to force Tracy's character into marriage. The film was directed by Harry Lachman and released by Fox Film.

Cast
 Spencer Tracy as Joe Buck
 Marian Nixon as Madge
 Stuart Erwin as Lucky
 Sam Hardy as Triplet The Great
 Sarah Padden as Ma Brown
 Frank McGlynn Jr. as Jim Brown
 Russell Simpson as Pa Nathan Brown
 Billy Platt as Jupiter - Midget
 Lila Lee as Sharon Hadley
 Guy Usher as Albert Preston

External links
 Face in the Sky, imdb.com; accessed July 24, 2015.

1933 films
Films directed by Harry Lachman
1933 romantic comedy films
American romantic comedy films
American black-and-white films
Fox Film films
1930s American films
Silent romantic comedy films